Sheikh Mohammed Irfan alias Shaukat Pardesi (Urdu: شوکت پردیسی, April 1924 – October 1995) was a poet, journalist and lyricist born in Malaysia, where his father Sheikh Sahib Ali had migrated from Maroofpur village in Jaunpur district of India. During 1950's Pardesi was associated with Urdu Daily Inquilab for some-time and also acted as the editor of Film Times Weekly magazine. He published and edited an acclaimed monthly Urdu magazine titled Munna for children. The writings of eminent writers like Niaz Fatehpuri, Ale Ahmad Suroor, Faiz Ahmed Faiz, etc. had supported Munna magazine during that time. His ghazals and nazms were published in almost all known Urdu journals and were recorded by HMV in the melodious voices of various famous singers of his time viz. Talat Mahmood, Manna Dey, C. H. Atma, Anup Jalota, Dilraj Kaur, Shailendra Singh, Shyam Lala, Mukesh and others.

Early life 

Pardesi was born in 1924 in Malaysia where he spent his childhood in material comfort and attained his primary education. In 1936, he came to India with his parents. Later on, due to World War II, travel between India and Malaysia discontinued. Consequently, Pardesi and his parents could not return to Malaysia. His father enrolled him in Darul Uloom Nadwatul Ulama, Lucknow for the continuation of his studies but subsequently he was shifted to Mission School (now Raja Shri Krishna Dutt Inter College) in Jaunpur from where he completed his middle school education. Although Pardesi's father Sheikh Sahib Ali built his new home in Jaunpur and settled there permanently but he did not succeed in arranging any regular source of income for the family. Reserved money started depleting and financial hardships became the new reality of life for the family. In January 1943, Shaukat Pardesi married Husnaara Begum. From 1944, his elders started leaving this mortal world. First of all mother, followed by his father and lastly the elder sister died in a span of three to four years. The changed circumstances of life without any concrete source of income along with the responsibility of an unmarried sister, two orphaned nieces, a wife and a son were too harsh for a 23/24-year young man who had lived his childhood and adolescence in luxuries. He tried many things for living that included even homeopathic practice too as a medic but did not succeed in any. Consequently, the necessities of life prevailed over self-respect and eventually he landed up at his father-in-law Hafiz Akhtar Ali's place, who was a well- known farmer of village Jamdahan in Jaunpur district. Hafiz Akhtar was also a Mukhtar in Jaunpur court. He had only two daughters. The elder daughter was reasonably well settled with her lawyer husband. Thus, Hafiz Akhtar Ali's own circumstances were such that warranted a supporting hand to look after his farming and wealth. The mutual needs of both made their match perfect but for some reason it did not lost long. As a result, in 1950, Pardesi left Jamdahan and went to Mumbai .

In Mumbai, he stayed for almost 8 years and by the time he grounded his feet in this city of hopes, he had a serious attack of heart palpitation (Ikhtelaj-e-Qalb) that made him virtually bed ridden and consequently he was left with no option but constrainedly to come back to his father-in-law's house in Jamdahan.

After 1958, Pardesi spent rest of his life in Jamdahan in the companionship of his wife and heart palpitation. He died in October 1995 in Jaunpur out of Cancer.

Literary Journey
Pardesi was quite a visible Urdu poet through Urdu magazines and periodicals, especially during late forties to seventies of last century. He wrote his first ghazal in late thirties/early forties of last century. In the beginning he wrote by his original name Mohammed Irfan. Subsequently, he changed his pen name to Shaukat Jaunpuri and when he reached Mumbai he again changed his pen name to Shaukat Pardesi. This new pen name became his final identity in the world of Urdu literature. Pardesi's pen touched almost all categories of Urdu poetry ranging from nazm and geet to ghazal, Qata and rubaaee. His poems were printed in the Urdu journals Shaaer Mumbai, Nerang-e-kheyal Lahore, Shamaa Delhi, Beesween Sadi Delhi, Bano Delhi, Khilauna Delhi, Gagan Mumbai, Naya Daur Lucknow, Pyam-e-Taleem Delhi, Tahreek Delhi, Aajkal Delhi, Jamalistaan Delhi, Shiraaz Karachi, Mashraqi Aanchal Delhi, Saaghar Lahore, Saboohi Lahore, Tabassum Hyderabad, Kahkashaan Mumbai, Shoa-ein Lahore, Mashhoor Delhi, Ittehaad Mumbai, Nikhat Allahabad, and many more.

Books

Pardesi could not publish any of his collection during his lifetime due to his personal circumstances. However, later on his son, Nadeem Ahmad tried to collect as many of his writings as he could and published them under the following four titles:
 Tohfa-e-Itfal: Published in 2011 and contains Pardesi's poems which he wrote for children
 Mizrab-e-Sukhan: Published in 2012 and comprises Pardesi's nazms and geets
 Saaz-e-Naghmabaar: Published in 2015 and contains Pardesi's ghazals, qataats and rubaaees 
 Mazameen-e-Shaukat: Published in 2015 and consists of articles reflecting some aspects his personal life as well as literary relationships

Journalism
Sheikh Mohammed Irfan alias Shaukat Pardesi was a poet, lyricist and journalist. He was born in Malaysia where his father Sheikh Sahib Ali had migrated from Maroofpur village in Jaunpur district of India. In 1936, his father returned to India with his family and settled in Jaunpur. During 1950's, Pardesi was associated with Urdu Daily Inquilab for some-time . and also acted as Editor of Film Times Weekly for few years. He published and edited an acclaimed monthly Urdu magazine Munna for children. Eminent writers of that time like Niaz Fatehpuri, Ale Ahmad Suroor, Faiz Ahmed Faiz, Ehtesham Hussain, etc. had supported Munna with their writings.

Filmography
Pardesi's association with film industry was limited and relatively unnoticed. He wrote songs for three films namely Khubsoorat, Ghulam Begam Badshah, and Shaheed-e-Aazam Bhagat Singh that were sung by Mohammed Rafi, and Asha Bhosale. In addition, he wrote dialogues for Ghulam Begam Badshah and Jhansi Ki Rani.

Non-film Songs
A number of Pardesi's ghazals and nazms were recorded by HMV in the voices of some of the famous singers of his time like Talat Mahmood, Manna Dey, C. H. Atma, Anup Jalota, Dilraj Kaur, Shailendra Singh, Shyam Lala and Mukesh. In particular, his ghazal "Hairan hoon aei sanam ki tujhe aur kya kahoon" in the voice of Manna Dey became especially popular.

Awards and recognition

 Uttar Pradesh Urdu Akademi Award (2014) to Tohfa-e-Atfal
 Uttar Pradesh Urdu Akademi Award (2016) to Saaz-e-Naghmabaar
 Research work on Suakat Pardesi by Habib Saifi in the form of Book titled as Shaukat Pardesi Fikr-O-Fan Ke Aiyene Mein published in 2017.

References

External links
 Ghulam Begum Badshah 1956, Lyricist Shaukat Pardesi
 Lyricist Shaukat Pardesi
 Shaukat Pardesi non film lyrics

1924 births
1995 deaths
Urdu-language poets from India
Indian lyricists
Journalists from Uttar Pradesh
Poets from Uttar Pradesh